Paul Nii Amu Andrew Darko (born 1995)  known as Darkovibes, is a Ghanaian born singer songwriter. His music categorizes as experimental music where he blends highlife, hip hop and rap. Darkovibes is known for his 2016 single 'Mercy'.

Early life and career 
He earned recognition as a nominee in the hip hop song of the year category at the Ghana Music Awards 2017 for his feature on Edem’s hit ‘Egboame’ the Remix.

Collaborations and influences 
Darkovibes has collaborated with artists including Omar Sterling of R2bees, Joey B, Edem, Efya, Magnom, Vacs (Music Producer), Pheelz Mr. Producer from Nigeria, and Kuvie (Music Producer). In 2016, he worked with MTN Ghana by writing and performing the theme song for the MTN Pulse Campaign.

As a member of the creative collective, La Meme Gang, he has collaborated with all the other members, namely, Kiddblack, Nxwrth(no longer part),RJZ, $pacely and Kwaku BS(no longer part). La Meme Gang released their first collaborative studio tape, La Meme Tape, in 2017.

Fashion style 
In 2017, Darkovibes, among a few others, was picked by Vogue Magazine UK to describe his distinctive style in music and fashion at Ghana's annual art and culture festival – ‘Chalewote’.

His fashion sense infuses unique fashion styles of colored hairstyles, side bags and fashion elements from the 80's.

Discography

Album 
 Kpanlogo (2020)

Singles 
 Bo Nor (2018)
 Shutdown (2017) 
 Placebo (2017)
 Tomorrow (2017)
 Mercy (2016)
 Shuga (2016)
 Siamese (2016)

Features

Albums 
 Joey B- Darryl EP (2017)
 Magnom- We Speed (2017)
 La Meme Gang- La Meme Tape (2017)
 PAQ- The Afrobeat Tape (2017)
 Dblack- Hunger & Thirst (2018)
 EL- WAV (2018)

Singles 
 KiDi - Bless Me (2019) 
Stonebwoy - Stay Woke (2018) 
 Nxwrth - Sundress (2019)
 Ayat - Bangers (2018) 
 Edem - Egboame (Remix) (2017)
 $pacely - Ikechukwu (2017)

Videography

References 

Ghanaian musicians
1995 births
Living people